is a Japanese footballer currently playing as a winger for Urawa Reds.

Career statistics

Club
.

Notes

Honors and awards

Club
Urawa Red Diamonds
Emperor's Cup: 2021

References

External links

1998 births
Living people
Chuo University alumni
Japanese footballers
Association football midfielders
Tokyo Verdy players
Urawa Red Diamonds players